The Municipality of Selnica ob Dravi is a municipality in the traditional region of Styria in northeastern Slovenia. The seat of the municipality is the town of Selnica ob Dravi. Selnica ob Dravi became a municipality in 1998.

Settlements
In addition to the municipal seat of Selnica ob Dravi, the municipality also includes the following settlements:

 Črešnjevec ob Dravi
 Fala
 Gradišče na Kozjaku
 Janževa Gora
 Spodnja Selnica
 Spodnji Boč
 Spodnji Slemen
 Sveti Duh na Ostrem Vrhu
 Veliki Boč
 Vurmat
 Zgornja Selnica
 Zgornji Boč
 Zgornji Slemen

References

External links

Municipality of Selnica ob Dravi on Geopedia
Municipality of Selnica ob Dravi website

Selnica ob Dravi
1998 establishments in Slovenia